Rani Khedira (born 27 January 1994) is a German professional footballer who plays as a midfielder for Bundesliga club Union Berlin.

Club career

VfB Stuttgart
Khedira started his youth career at TV Oeffingen before moving to VfB Stuttgart in 2005, a year before his older brother, Sami, joined. After progressing the ranks of Stuttgart Academy, he began to play for the U16 side by 2009. He signed a contract with the club, keeping him until 2013. On 28 January 2012, Khedira had his debut for VfB Stuttgart II in the 3. Liga against FC Rot-Weiß Erfurt. During his time at VfB Stuttgart's reserves, he scored once for the side, in a 4–0 win over Wacker Burghausen on 8 September 2013.

On 23 October 2012, Khedira was promoted to the first team of VfB Stuttgart. He extended his contract with the club on 28 January 2013 until June 2015. However throughout the 2012–13 season, Khedira never made his first team appearances, as he appeared the most of the season as an unused substitute.

On 1 September 2013, Khedira made his Bundesliga debut for VfB Stuttgart in a 6–2 home victory against 1899 Hoffenheim. On 7 December 2013, when he made his first start for Stuttgart, in a 4–2 win over Hannover 96. From 29 January 2014 and 2 March 2014, he had a handful of starting his first team places. Although he lost his first team place later on, Khedira went on to make nine appearances for the club.

RB Leipzig

For the 2014–15 season, Khedira moved to RB Leipzig, signing a three-year contract, keeping him until 2017. The move was reported to be undisclosed. RB Leipzig had been keen on signing him since September 2013.

Khedira made his RB Leipzig debut in the opening game of the season, playing the whole game, in a 0–0 draw against VfR Aalen. After making his RB Leipzig debut, he quickly established himself in the first team and played a key role for the club in his first season. He also became a regular start player from the beginning of the season until he was suspended for one match against SV Sandhausen on 30 November 2014 having picked up five yellow cards this season. However, in a 1–0 loss against FSV Frankfurt on 15 February 2015, he suffered a leg injury in the 69th minute and was substituted as a result. The injury kept him out of action for several weeks. On 17 May 2015, he returned to the first team from injury, in a 2–1 loss against Ingolstadt. In his first season at the club, Khedira went on to make 24 appearances in all competitions.

In his second season at RB Leipzig, Khedira found himself in a competition for his position and this resulted in him sitting on the substitutes bench at the start of the season. Later in the season, he was plagued by injuries. Nevertheless, he went on to make 16 appearances in all competitions, as RB Leipzig were promoted to the Bundesliga.

Ahead of the 2016–17 season, Khedira's first team opportunities continued to be limited and remained on the substitute bench following new competitions and by November, he had not made his first appearance of the season. On 25 November 2016, he made his first appearance of the 2016–17 season, coming on as a second-half substitute, in a 4–1 win over Freiburg. He went on to make ten appearances for the club this season. However, it was announced that Khedira was released by the club. He had previously been advised by his brother not to leave the club.

FC Augsburg
With his RB Leipzig contract expiring at the end of the 2016–17 season, Khedira joined fellow Bundesliga club FC Augsburg on 7 June 2017, signing a four-year contract.

International career
After being featured for Germany U15 and Germany U16, Khedira was featured for Germany U17 and played for Germany at the 2011 FIFA U-17 World Cup, where he played five times in the tournament. The following year, Khedira was called up Germany U19 and immediately made an impact when he scored on his debut, in a 3–0 win over France U19 on 14 November 2012. He made another Germany U19 appearance on 25 March 2013, in a 2–0 win over Ukraine U19.

Three years on, Khedira earned a call-up by Germany U21 in November 2014. Through his father, he is eligible to play for Tunisia, but he rejected call-ups to the team from the Tunisian FA.

Personal life
Khedira was born in Stuttgart to a German mother and a Tunisian father. He is the younger brother of Germany international Sami Khedira. He also has an older brother, Denny.

Khedira revealed that his father and older brother, Sami, influenced him to play football. He quoted on his position: "The Six is my primary position, but I've played as a centre-back, too, or have moved half a position forward when we're two-a-side, I think I can adapt anywhere." In response to being Sami's younger brother, Rani Khedira made it clear that he was not like his brother and that he wanted to go his own way. Khedira also revealed that he has a qualification as a sports and fitness salesman.

Career statistics

Honours
Germany U-17
 FIFA U-17 World Cup third place: 2011

References

External links
 
 Rani Khedira at fifa.com

1994 births
Living people
Footballers from Stuttgart
German footballers
Germany youth international footballers
German people of Tunisian descent
German sportspeople of African descent
Association football midfielders
Bundesliga players
2. Bundesliga players
3. Liga players
Regionalliga players
Oberliga (football) players
VfB Stuttgart II players
VfB Stuttgart players
RB Leipzig players
FC Augsburg players
1. FC Union Berlin players